Abul Khair Group is a Bangladeshi diversified conglomerate based in Dhaka. Abul Kashem is the chairperson and Abul Hashem is the managing director of Abul Khair Group.  Abu Syed Chowdhury is the deputy managing director and Shah Shafiqul Islam is the group director. All four are sons of Abul Khair.

History 
Abul Khair Group was founded in 1953 as a maker of Beedi, hand rolled cigarettes.

Abul Khair Tobacco Company Limited offered free gifts with their cigarettes in 2009. This violated Narcotics Control Act, 2005 which prohibits the advertising and promotion of tobacco products.

A mobile court fined Abul Khair Group for breaking Bangladesh Standards and Testing Institution rules by not labeling their milk products with a Maximum Retail Price on 2 February 2010.

On 16 February 2011, two vessels owned by Abul Khair Group, MV Titu-22 and MV Titu-21, sank off the coast of Kutubdia Lighthouse near the Port of Chittagong after colliding with MV RAMSI. They had 26 crews of whom seven were lost at sea.

In May 2012, Bangladesh Inland Water Transport Authority started an eviction against Shah Cement factory on the banks of Shitalakkhya in Munshiganj District. They sought to demolish two jetties which they alleged were built illegally. The Bangladesh Inland Water Transport Authority  were ordered to slow down the drive as the Minister of Shipping Shajahan Khan was negotiating with the owners of Abul Khair Group. The drive was suspended after successful negotiations. Department of Environment fined Abul Khair Group 4 million taka for illegally cutting hills in Sitakunda Upazila in July 2012.

A Chinese construction worker died while working on building of Abul Khair Steel Re-Rolling Mill on 19 August 2013. He was employed by a Chinese subcontractor hired by Abul Khair.

Abul Khair Group has an industrial hub in Sitakunda Upazila in Chittagong District. They sought permission from Board of Investment to secure a loan from a foreign bank to expand their re-rolling plant in Sitakunda in July 2015.

In January 2018, Anti-Corruption Commission interrogated three directors of the group on allegations of loan embezzlement and tax dodging. Abul Khair Steel was recognized as a Superbrand in September 2018.

Abul Khair Group owned Shah Cement had the largest market share in Bangladesh in 2019. In December 2019, Shah Cement Industries set up the largest vertical roller cement mill in the world per Guinness World Records. The roller was built by Danish company FLSmidth. Department of Environment found Abul Khair Steel and Power Limited, located in Madambibir Hat, Sitakunda Upazila, had violated environmental laws. The plant had received permission to produce 25 megawatts but it was producing 75 megawatts illegally. The plant was also operating without the air treatment plant which was inoperable.

MV Borni Prince-2, owned by Abul Khair Group, sank after hitting a port buoy near Karnaphuli River. It was carrying out 1,400 tonnes of scrap metals taken from a vessel anchored offshore. The crew were rescued by another nearby vessel according to Bangladesh Inland Water Transport Authority. Bangladesh Coast Guard and Bangladesh Navy were tasked to salvage the ship.

Abul Khair Group signed an agreement with Bangladesh Chess Federation in February 2020 to sponsor National School Chess championship.

On 21 September 2020, a vessel, Titu-19, owned by Abul Khair Group partially capsized near Bhasan Char. It was carrying cement clinkers, around 1,250 tonnes, from a mothership anchored off Chittagong Port to Moktarpur in Munshiganj District. According to an official of Bangladesh Inland Water Transport Authority, the boat develop cracks due to strong currents. According to Lighter Vessel Workers Association the crew were rescued by Arju, an oil tanker.

Mohammad Kamrul Hasan, sanitary inspector of Dhaka South City Corporation, filed a case against chairman Abul Kashem and chief executive officer BR Sharma of Abul Khair Milk Products Limited accusing them of using deceptive marketing practices in promoting Marks Diabetic Milk. On 11 November 2020, Khadiza Bhuiyan of Dhaka Court found in favor of the defendant and Hasan said he plans to file an appeal against the verdict. Hasan told New Age newspaper that "We are fighting a losing battle".

In June 2020, Abul Khair Group supplied free oxygen to hospitals in Chittagong during the COVID-19 pandemic in Bangladesh from its steel plant that also had an industrial oxygen production unit. Hospitals receiving oxygen included Chattogram Field Hospital, Chittagong General Hospital, and Bangladesh Institute of Tropical and Infectious Diseases. They also provided support to AHM Mustafa Kamal, Minister of Finance, to start ICU operations in his constituency for COVID-19 patients in April 2021.

Businesses 
 Abul Khair Steel-Cow Brand
 Shah Cement
 Ready Mix Concrete
 Marks Full Cream Milk Powder
 AMA Full Cream Milk Powder
 Seylon Tea
 Fahim Marble
 Coffee Bite
 Cereal
 Stella Luxury Sanitary Ware
 Goru Marka corrugated iron sheet

See also 
 Bombay Sweets

References 

Organisations based in Chittagong
Conglomerate companies of Bangladesh
1953 establishments in East Pakistan